is a single by SKE48. It reached number 1 at the Oricon singles charts.

Track listing

Type A

Type B

Type C

Theater Edition

Members

"Kataomoi Finally" 
 Team S: Masana Ōya, Yuria Kizaki, Mizuki Kuwabara, Akari Suda, Kanako Hiramatsu, Jurina Matsui, Rena Matsui, Kumi Yagami
 Team KII: Shiori Ogiso, Akane Takayanagi, Sawako Hata, Airi Furukawa, Rina Matsumoto, Manatsu Mukaida
 Team E: Shiori Kaneko, Kanon Kimoto

"Kyō made no Koto, Korekara no koto" 
 All Members

"Hanikami Lollipop" 
Shirogumi
 Team S: Haruka Ono, Yūka Nakanishi, Rikako Hirata, Jurina Matsui
 Team KII: Riho Abiru, Anna Ishida, Risako Gotō, Tomoka Wakabayashi
 Team E: Kyōka Isohara, Aya Shibata, Erika Yamada
 Kenkyūsei: Makiko Saitō

"Koe ga Kasureru Kurai" 
Akagumi
 Team S: Rumi Katō, Yukiko Kinoshita, Shiori Takada, Aki Deguchi, Rena Matsui 
 Team KII: Seira Satō, Miki Yakata
 Team E: Kasumi Ueno, Madoka Umemoto, Minami Hara, Haruka Mano, Yukari Yamashita

"Kamoku na Tsuki" 
Selection 8
 Team S: Yuria Kizaki, Jurina Matsui, Rena Matsui, Kumi Yagami
 Team KII: Anna Ishida, Shiori Ogiso, Akane Takayanagi
 Team E: Kanon Kimoto

Oricon Charts

References

SKE48 songs
Avex Trax singles
2012 singles
Songs written by Yasushi Akimoto
Oricon Weekly number-one singles
Billboard Japan Hot 100 number-one singles
2012 songs
LGBT-related songs